The School District of Palm Beach County (SDPBC) is the tenth-largest public school district in the United States, and the fifth largest school district in Florida. The district encompasses all of Palm Beach County. For the beginning of the 2018–2019 academic year, enrollment totaled 192,533 students in Pre-K through 12th grades. The district operates a total of 180 schools: 109 elementary, 34 middle, 23 high, 14 alternative, adult and community, intermediate, and Exceptional Student Education (ESE). It has 27,168 employees and 45,000 volunteers.

Established in 1909, the district was known as the Palm Beach County Board of Public Instruction until the mid-1980s. It is accredited by Cognia (formerly known as Advance-ED). The district's headquarters are in the Fulton-Holland Educational Services Center in Palm Springs.

Schools
As of 2010–2011, the district is responsible for the following schools:
 Wellington Community High School / Adult  Center

Adult and community

 Adult Education Center
 Delray Full Service Center

Alternative

 AMIKids – Palm Beach
 CARP
 Crossroads Academy
 Elementary Transition – West at Crossroads Academy
 Elementary Transition North / Central – Gold Coast
 Gold Coast Community School
 Highridge Family Center
 Intensive Transition – South at South Area School of Choice
 Intensive Transition – West at Crossroads Academy
 Kelly Center
 PACE Center for Girls
 Palm Beach County Jail
 Palm Beach Juvenile Correction Facility
 Palm Beach Juvenile Detention
 Riviera Beach Preparatory and Achievement Academy
 Turning Points Academy

Elementary

 Acreage Pines Elementary School
 Addison Mizner Elementary School, until closure in August 2021
 Allamanda Elementary School
 Banyan Creek Elementary School
 Barton Elementary School
 Belle Glade Elementary School
 Belvedere Elementary School
 Benoist Farms Elementary School
 Berkshire Elementary School
 Binks Forest Elementary School
 Boca Raton Elementary School
 Calusa Elementary School
 Cholee Lake Elementary School
 Citrus Cove Elementary School
 Clifford O. Taylor / Kirklane Elementary School
 Coral Reef Elementary School
 Coral Sunset Elementary School
 Crosspointe Elementary School
 Crystal Lakes Elementary School
 Cypress Trails Elementary School
 Del Prado Elementary School
 Diamond View Elementary School
 Discovery Key Elementary School
 Dr. Mary McLeod Bethune Elementary School
 Dwight D. Eisenhower Elementary School
 Egret Lake Elementary School
 Elbridge Gale Elementary School
 Equestrian Trails Elementary School
 Everglades Elementary School
 Forest Hill Elementary School
 Forest Park Elementary School
 Freedom Shores Elementary School
 Frontier Elementary School
 Galaxy Elementary School
 Glade View Elementary School
 Golden Grove Elementary School
 Gove Elementary School
 Grassy Waters Elementary School
 Greenacres Elementary School
 Grove Park Elementary School
 H. L. Johnson Elementary School
 Hagen Road Elementary School
 Hammock Pointe Elementary School
 Heritage Elementary School
 Highland Elementary School
 Hope-Centennial Elementary School
 Indian Pines Elementary School
 J. C. Mitchell Elementary School
 Jerry Thomas Elementary School
 Jupiter Elementary School
 Jupiter Farms Elementary School
 K. E. Cunningham / Canal Point Elementary School
 Lake Park Elementary School
 Lantana Elementary School
 Liberty Park Elementary School
 Lighthouse Elementary School
 Limestone Creek Elementary School
 Lincoln Elementary School
 Loxahatchee Groves Elementary School
 Manatee Elementary School
 Marsh Pointe Elementary School
 Meadow Park Elementary School
 Melaleuca Elementary School
 Morikami Park Elementary School
 New Horizons Elementary School
 North Grade Elementary School
 Northboro Elementary School
 Northmore Elementary School
 Orchard View Elementary School
 Pahokee Elementary School
 Palm Beach Gardens Elementary School
 Palm Beach Public
 Palm Springs Elementary School
 Palmetto Elementary School
 Panther Run Elementary School
 Pierce Hammock Elementary School
 Pine Grove Elementary School
 Pine Jog Elementary School
 Pioneer Park Elementary School
 Pleasant City Elementary School
 Plumosa School of the Arts
 Poinciana Elementary School
 Rolling Green Elementary School
 Roosevelt Elementary School
 Rosenwald Elementary School
 Royal Palm Beach Elementary School
 S. D. Spady Elementary School
 Sandpiper Shores Elementary School
 Seminole Trails Elementary School
 South Grade Elementary School
 South Olive Elementary School
 Starlight Cove Elementary School
 Sunrise Park Elementary School
 Sunset Palms Elementary School
 Timber Trace Elementary School
 The Conservatory School at North Palm Beach
 U. B. Kinsey / Palmview Elementary School
 Washington Elementary School
 Waters Edge Elementary School
 Wellington Elementary School
 West Gate Elementary School
 West Riviera Elementary School
 Westward Elementary School
 Whispering Pines Elementary School
 Wynnebrook Elementary School

ESE

 Indian Ridge School
 Royal Palm School

Middle

 Bak Middle School of the Arts
 Bear Lakes Middle School
 Boca Raton Community Middle School
 Carver Community Middle School
 Christa McAuliffe Middle School
 Congress Middle School
 Conniston Community Middle School
 Crestwood Middle School
 Don Estridge High Tech Middle School 
 Eagles Landing Middle School
 Emerald Cove Middle School
 Howell L. Watkins Middle School
 Independence Middle School
 Jeaga Middle School
 John F. Kennedy Middle School
 Jupiter Middle School
 L. C. Swain Middle School
 Lake Shore Middle School
 Lake Worth Middle School
 Lantana Community Middle School
 Loggers Run Community Middle School
 Odyssey Middle School, until closure in 2017
 Okeeheelee Middle School
 Omni Middle School
 Osceola Creek Middle School
 Pahokee Middle School
 Palm Springs Community Middle School
 Polo Park Middle School
 Roosevelt Community Middle School
 Royal Palm School
 Somerset Academy Canyons Middle School
 Tradewinds Middle School
 Watson B. Duncan Middle School
 Wellington Landings Middle School
 Western Pines Middle School
 Woodlands Middle School

Intermediate
 Beacon Cove Intermediate School

K–12

 Palm Beach Virtual School
 Village Academy on the Art & Sara Jo Kobacker Campus

Hidden Oaks K-8
Verde K-8
Addison Mizner K-8 (as of August 2021)

High

 Alexander W. Dreyfoos Jr. School of the Arts
 Atlantic Community High School
 Boca Raton Community High School
 Boynton Beach Community High School
 Forest Hill Community High School
 G-Star School Of The Arts
 Glades Central Community High School
 John I. Leonard Community High School
 Jupiter Community High School
 Lake Worth Community High School
 Olympic Heights Community High School
 Pahokee High School
 Palm Beach Central High School
 Palm Beach Gardens Community High School
 Palm Beach Lakes Community High School
 Park Vista Community High School
 Royal Palm Beach Community High School
 Santaluces Community High School
 Seminole Ridge Community High School
 Somerset Academy Canyons High School
 Spanish River Community High School
 Suncoast Community High School
 Wellington Community High School
 West Boca Raton Community High School
 William T. Dwyer High School

Defunct racially segregated  schools
Racially segregated  schools included:
 Boca Raton Negro High School, renamed Roadman School in 1956
 Colored School No. 4
 Everglades Camp, grades 1–6, 1955-1966
 East Lake High School (Pahokee)
 Everglades Vocational High School] (Belle Glade), renamed [[Lake Shore High School (Belle Glade) in 1955
 George Washington Carver High School (Delray Beach, Florida)
 Industrial High School (West Palm Beach, Florida), renamed Roosevelt Junior-Senior High School in 1950, then Roosevelt High School
 Lincoln High School (Riviera Beach, Florida), in building formerly housing West Riviera Junior High School
 Osborne School (Lake Worth, Florida)

District leadership
Michael J. Burke was named interim  superintendent of the Palm Beach County School District in July 2021 and selected for a full term in October 2021.  The district is governed by a school board. The board consists of seven members, who are all elected from single-member districts. One of the Board Members is elected chair and one of them is elected Vice Chair. Board members serve staggered terms, and members from Districts 1, 2, and 5 are elected during presidential election years, while the members from Districts 3, 4, 6, and 7 are elected in gubernatorial election years. Board members are Frank A. Barbieri Jr esq. (Chairman, District 5), Karen Brill (Vice Chair District 3),  Barbara McQuinn (District 1), Alexandria Ayala (District 2) Erica Whitfield (District 4), Marcia Andrews (District 6), and Debra Robinson, M.D. (District 7).

Demographics 
As of the 2019–2020 school year, in its enrollment breakdown by ethnic group, 35.9% of its students were of Hispanic origin, of any race; 29.6% of students were of Non-Hispanic white ancestry; 27.7% of students were African-American; 3.0% of students were Asian-American; 2.8% of students were of multiple race categories, while Native Americans and Pacific Islanders composed less than 1% of the student population.

Regarding economic status, 58.4% of students are considered economically disadvantaged.

Performance 
As of the 2018–2019 school year, SDPBC has a graduation rate of 87.1%, up from 82.3% from the 2015–2016 school year. During the 2019 spring examination of the statewide Florida Standards Assessments, 54% of third grade students achieved basic proficiency or higher in English language arts

Controversy

Prior to 2021, the board had taken "major steps to improve equity among students", though "glaring disparities" in suspension rates, student performance, and attendance between black and white students remained.  In part because of these disparities, on May 5, 2021, the school board adopted an equity statement which said it is "committed to dismantling structures rooted in white advantage".  At a board meeting on May 26, 2021, many parents said the equity statement stoked racial tension, and introduced Marxist ideology and critical race theory.  The board voted to remove the controversial statement because it had angered so many people.

References

https://www.palmbeachschools.org/showcase/schoolsbylevel/"Schools by Level"

External links

 
 School District of Palm Beach County – Official Website
 Largest 100 U.S. School Districts

Palm Beach County
Education in Palm Beach County, Florida
West Palm Beach, Florida
Boynton Beach, Florida
Wellington, Florida
1909 establishments in Florida
School districts established in 1909